Michigan's 76th House of Representatives district (also referred to as Michigan's 76th House district) is a legislative district within the Michigan House of Representatives located in part Eaton County. The district was created in 1965, when the Michigan House of Representatives district naming scheme changed from a county-based system to a numerical one.

List of representatives

Recent Elections

Historical district boundaries

References 

Michigan House of Representatives districts
Kent County, Michigan